The Kemmendine (1924) was a British merchant ship. She was sunk by the German raider Atlantis in the Indian Ocean on 13 July 1940, en route from Glasgow to Burma. Records relating to the ship are held by the British National Archives.

References

External links 

Camp diaries reveal amazing bravery of the teenage sailor who became the youngest prisoner of war. The Sunday Post

Maritime incidents in July 1940
1924 ships
Steamships of the United Kingdom
World War II shipwrecks in the Indian Ocean